Cappelli is a surname. Notable people with the surname include:

Alexander Cappelli (born 1984), Australian musician and actor
Dante Cappelli (1866–1948), Italian actor
Elena Bianchini-Cappelli (1873–1919), Italian dramatic soprano opera singer
Francesco Cappelli (born 1943), retired Italian professional football player
Frank Cappelli (1852–1918), the star of the children's television series Cappelli & Company
Gari Cappelli (born 1961), Croatian politician
Giulio Cappelli (1911–1995), Italian football (soccer) player
Gregory W. Cappelli (born ), American business executive
Peter Cappelli (born 1956), American economist
Raffaele Cappelli (1848–1921), Italian politician and diplomat
Steven W. Cappelli (born 1963), American politician

See also
A.F. Cappelli Block, historic site at 263 Atwells Avenue in Providence, Rhode Island
Cappelli & Company, American children's television series